Treat Me Like a Lady is a song produced by Ray Hedges and released as a single by Pop Idol contestant Zoe Birkett in 2003. The single peaked at number 12 on the UK Singles Chart and number 43 in Ireland.

Charts

References

2003 songs
2003 singles
19 Recordings singles
Song recordings produced by Ray Hedges